José Ruiz Durango (born 22 January 1980 in Maracaibo) is a Venezuelan sailor. He competed at the 2008 and 2012 Summer Olympics in the Men's Laser class.

References

1980 births
Living people
Olympic sailors of Venezuela
Venezuelan male sailors (sport)
Sailors at the 2008 Summer Olympics – Laser
Sailors at the 2012 Summer Olympics – Laser
Sportspeople from Maracaibo